South Africa–Serbia relations are foreign relations between South Africa and Serbia. Serbia has an Embassy in Pretoria and South Africa a non-resident Embassy in Athens, Greece which is also accredited to Serbia.

Relations 
South Africa is Serbia's closest ally in Africa  and the two nations have had excellent relations since the signing of diplomatic relations in 1992 following the end of the apartheid system. South Africa is also home to around 20,000 Serbs mainly living in the Johannesburg area. South Africa has voiced support for Serbia over the issue of Kosovo's independence. Nelson Mandela was an honorary citizen of Belgrade.

Economic relations
A delegation of South African businessmen visited Serbia in January 2012 to finalize negotiations on the construction of a mineral water bottling plant in the vicinity of Požarevac, on investing in several mines in eastern and southern Serbia and on buying agricultural complexes in Vojvodina.

High level visits
In 2010, Serbian Foreign Minister Vuk Jeremić visited South Africa  and met International Relations and Cooperation Minister Maite Nkoana-Mashabane. During this visit, Serbia pledged its support for South Africa's candidature for a non-permanent seat on the United Nations Security Council for the 2011–2012 term.

See also 
 Serbian South African
 Foreign relations of South Africa 
 Foreign relations of Serbia
 Yugoslavia and the Non-Aligned Movement
 Yugoslavia and the Organisation of African Unity

References

External links 
 Africa/index_e.html  Serbian Ministry of Foreign Affairs about relations with South Africa
  Serbian Ministry of Foreign Affairs: direction of the Serbian embassy in Pretoria
 

 
South Africa
Bilateral relations of South Africa